Jarmila Veselá (29 November 1899 Prague  2 January 1972 Prague) was a Czechoslovak criminal lawyer, first associate professor at the Faculty of Law of the Charles University in Prague. During the protectorate period when the Czech universities were closed, she became head of the criminal-biological department of the Czech Eugenic Society, a member of which was already before the war, and after 1942 an assistant at the Criminological Institute of the Faculty of Law of the German University.

References

1899 births
1972 deaths
Czechoslovak lawyers
Charles University alumni